The Sungai Siput incident is an event that marked the beginning of the Malayan Emergency on 16 June 1948. Three European plantation managers were killed at Sungai Siput, Perak in two different rubber estate named Elphil estate and Phin Soon estate. The distance of these estates was two kilometer long. 

Elphil Estate manager A.E. Walker was shot in at his office desk at 8.30am. Thirty minutes later, Phin Soon manager John Allison and his assistant Ian Christian of the Phin Soon Estate were tied and killed by Communists.

This attack led to the declaration of a state of emergency a few weeks later.  

On 13 July 1950, Inspector Ralph Lewis Inder of the Malay Police was attacked by insurgents and died at Ipoh hospital. Boris Hembry was a planter and in his book entitled “Malaysian Spymaster: Memoirs of a rubber planter, bandit fighter and spy”, he wrote: “It would appear that early on that morning, communist terrorists had slashed a lot of young rubber trees on Dovenby. Ralph had gone out to investigate and the bandits were waiting for him. Ralph and his escort of two constables were outnumbered six to one, but they put up a good fight. One of the special constables was killed and the other badly wounded, and the bandits got away with their weapons.”

Fourth target 
Another attack was planned on a fourth European estate nearby, however this failed because the target's jeep broke down making him late for work. More gunmen were sent to kill him but left after failing to find him. The British enacted emergency measures into law in response to the Sungai Siput incident. Under these measures the colonial government outlawed the Malayan Communist Party (MCP) and began mass arresting thousands of trade union and left-wing activists.

References

External links

Wars involving the United Kingdom
Malayan Emergency
June 1948 events in Asia
1948 in Malaya